Taxamairin A is a non-taxane isolate of Taxus yunnanensis.

References 

Diterpenes
Tropones